Tordoff is a surname. Notable people with the surname include:

Geoffrey Tordoff, Baron Tordoff (born 1928), British businessman and politician
Gerry Tordoff (1929–2008), British first-class cricketer
Harrison B. Tordoff (1923–2008), American ornithologist and conservationist
Michael Tordoff (born 1956), British psychobiologist
Rennie Fritchie, Baroness Fritchie (born 1942), British civil servant
Sam Tordoff (born 1989), British racing car driver
Chris Tordoff, Irish actor and comedian also known as Francis "the Viper" Higgins